Franconia is a former siding in Mohave County, Arizona, United States.

References

Ghost towns in Arizona
Former populated places in Mohave County, Arizona